Apostle, an anglicization of the Greek ἀπόστολος (apóstolos), refers to a messenger or ambassador.

Apostle may also refer to:

Religion
 Apostles in the New Testament, the primary apostles of Jesus Christ
 Apostle (Latter Day Saints), a position in The Church of Jesus Christ of Latter-day Saints
 Chief Apostle, highest minister in the New Apostolic Church
 Seventy disciples, also known as the Seventy Apostles by the Eastern Orthodox Church
 Apostles (Manichaeism)
 Apostle (Islam), Islamic prophet or messenger
 Apostles of Bahá'u'lláh, nineteen early followers of Bahá'u'lláh

Entertainment
 The Apostle, a 1997 film directed by and starring Robert Duvall
 The Apostle (novel), a spy  novel by Brad Thor
 The Apostles (film), a 2014 Chinese film
 El Apóstol, the world's oldest animated feature film, 1917
 Apostle (production company), a television production company founded by Jim Serpico and Denis Leary
 The Apostles, a 1960s British rock band later known as The Snobs
 The Apostles (band), a punk rock band from the 1980s
 The Apostles (Elgar), a 1903 choral work by Edward Elgar
 The 7 Apostles, characters from the Chrono Crusade manga series
 Apostle (film), a 2018 period horror film directed by Gareth Evans

Other uses
 Apostle Islands, in Lake Superior
 Apostle plant, the plant genus Neomarica, which closely resemble irises
 Cambridge Apostles, a secret society at the University of Cambridge

See also
 Apostol (disambiguation)
 Apostolic (disambiguation)
 Apostolic Age
 Apostolos (disambiguation)
 Apostle of Mercy (disambiguation)
 Twelve Apostles (disambiguation)